Wiek may refer to:

the old German name for Lääne County, Estonia
a common German dialect name for bays on the coast of Pomerania
Wiek, Rügen, a municipality on the island of Rügen, Germany
 WIEK-LD, a defunct low-power television station (channel 23) formerly licensed to serve Midland, Michigan, United States

See also
Wieck (disambiguation)
Wyk (disambiguation)
Wick (disambiguation)